DJ-Kicks: Claude Young is a DJ mix album, mixed by Claude Young. It was released on 3 June 1996 on the Studio !K7 independent record label as part of the DJ-Kicks series.

Track listing
  Claude Young & Ian O'Brien - Joe 90
  Maurizio - M5
  Various Artists - *
  Akio Milan Paak - Countach
  Counterpoint - Jigsaw
  Skinless Brothers - Backyard
  Clark - Lofthouse
  Da Sampla - With A Piece Of Ice
  Dirty House Crew - Internal Affairs
  Surgeon - Badger Bite
  Random XS - Frantic Formula
  Claude Young - Acid Wash Conflict
  Man Made - Space Wreak
  Ratio - Gastrek
  Skinless Brothers - Zwung
  Man Made - Industry
  Dopplereffekt - Speak & Spell
  Clark - Dial
  Clark - Jak To Basics
  Claude Young - DJ KiCKS (The Track)

References

External links 
official site
DJ-Kicks website

Young, Claude
1996 compilation albums